Penang Turf Club is a major horse racing course in Penang, Malaysia which was established in 1864. In addition to racing, the club also provides equestrian facilities and a golf course.

See also
 Sport in Malaysia

External links 

1864 establishments
1860s establishments in British Malaya
Turf clubs in Malaysia
Sports venues in Penang